The 2015 Istanbul Open (also known as the TEB BNP Paribas Istanbul Open for sponsorship purposes) was a men's tennis tournament played on outdoor clay courts. It was part of the 2015 ATP World Tour. It was the first edition of the Istanbul Open, and an ATP World Tour 250 event. It took place at the Koza World of Sports Arena in Istanbul, Turkey, from 27 April through 3 May 2015.

Singles main draw entrants

Seeds

Rankings are as of April 20, 2015.

Other entrants
The following players received wildcards into the main draw:
  Nikoloz Basilashvili
  Cem İlkel
  Andrey Rublev

The following players received entry via the qualifying draw:
  Teymuraz Gabashvili
  Blaž Kavčič
  Thanasi Kokkinakis
  Aleksandr Nedovyesov

Withdrawals
Before the tournament
  Paolo Lorenzi →replaced by Ivan Dodig
  Juan Mónaco →replaced by Daniel Gimeno-Traver

Retirements
  Steve Darcis

Doubles main draw entrants

Seeds

 Rankings are as of April 20, 2015.

Other entrants
The following pair received wildcards into the doubles main draw:
  Tuna Altuna /  Nikoloz Basilashvili
  Marsel İlhan /  Cem İlkel

The following pair received entry as alternates:
  Fedor Chervyakov /  Mark Fynn

Withdrawals
Before the tournament
  Steve Darcis

Champions

Singles

  Roger Federer def.  Pablo Cuevas, 6–3, 7–6(13–11)

Doubles

  Radu Albot /  Dušan Lajović def.  Robert Lindstedt /  Jürgen Melzer, 6–4, 7–6(7–2)

References

External links
Official website

Istanbul Open
2015 in Istanbul
2015 in Turkish tennis
2015
Istanbul Open
Istanbul Open